Giovanni Battista Ambrosiani (born 2 July 1772, Milan – 19 February 1832, Karlberg Palace) was an Italian ballet dancer. He arrived in Stockholm in 1795 and was taken on by the Royal Swedish Ballet as its premier danseur, then as its ballet master from 1823 to 1827. He was also dance master and gymnastics master at the Military Academy Karlberg until 1834. He notably created ballets for operas like Il turco in Italia by  Rossini, Preciosa by Weber and Fernand Cortez by Spontini.

References

Succession 

1772 births
1832 deaths
Italian male ballet dancers
Dancers from Milan
Ballet masters
19th-century Italian ballet dancers
18th-century Italian ballet dancers
Royal Swedish Ballet dancers